This article provides details on candidates who stood at the 2010 Australian federal election.

Nominations were formally declared open by the Australian Electoral Commission following the issue of the writ on 19 July 2010. Nominations closed on 29 July 2010. The received nominations were declared publicly on 30 July 2010.

The election was held on Saturday 21 August 2010.

Redistributions and seat changes
Redistributions of electoral boundaries occurred in New South Wales, Queensland, Western Australia, Tasmania and the Northern Territory.
In New South Wales, the Labor-held seat of Prospect was renamed McMahon, and the Labor-held seat of Lowe was abolished. The Liberal-held seats of Gilmore, Greenway and Macarthur became notionally Labor.
The member for Greenway, Louise Markus (Liberal), contested Macquarie.
The member for Lowe, John Murphy (Labor), contested Reid.
The member for Prospect, Chris Bowen (Labor), contested McMahon.
The member for Reid, Laurie Ferguson (Labor), contested Werriwa.
The member for Werriwa, Chris Hayes (Labor), contested Fowler.
In Queensland, the notionally LNP seat of Wright was created. The LNP-held seats of Dickson and Herbert became notionally Labor.
In Western Australia, the Liberal-held seat of Kalgoorlie was abolished, and the notionally Liberal seat of Durack was created. The Liberal-held seat of Swan became notionally Labor.
The member for Kalgoorlie, Barry Haase (Liberal), contested Durack.
There were minimal changes in Tasmania and the Northern Territory.

Retiring Members and Senators

Labor
 James Bidgood MP (Dawson, Qld): announced retirement 5 February 2010
 Jodie Campbell MP (Bass, Tas): announced retirement 30 October 2009
 Bob Debus MP (Macquarie, NSW): announced retirement 5 June 2009
 Annette Ellis MP (Canberra, ACT): announced retirement 22 January 2010
 Jennie George MP (Throsby, NSW): announced retirement 19 November 2009
 Julia Irwin MP (Fowler, NSW): announced retirement 14 September 2009
 Duncan Kerr MP (Denison, Tas): announced retirement 10 September 2009
 Bob McMullan MP (Fraser, ACT): announced retirement 19 January 2010
 Belinda Neal MP (Robertson, NSW): lost preselection 6 March 2010, announced retirement 29 July 2010
 Roger Price MP (Chifley, NSW): announced retirement 19 March 2010
 Lindsay Tanner MP (Melbourne, Vic): announced retirement 24 June 2010
 Senator Michael Forshaw (NSW): announced retirement 1 March 2010
 Senator Annette Hurley (SA): announced retirement 1 July 2010
 Senator Kerry O'Brien (Tas): lost preselection 9 April 2010, did not renominate

Liberal
 Fran Bailey MP (McEwen, Vic): announced retirement 7 October 2009
 Pat Farmer MP (Macarthur, NSW): lost preselection 30 October 2009; announced retirement 15 February 2010
 Petro Georgiou MP (Kooyong, Vic): announced retirement 23 November 2008
 David Hawker MP (Wannon, Vic): announced retirement 1 June 2009
 Peter Lindsay MP (Herbert, Qld): announced retirement 27 January 2010
 Margaret May MP (McPherson, Qld): announced retirement 14 August 2009
 Chris Pearce MP (Aston, Vic): announced retirement 23 June 2009
 Danna Vale MP (Hughes, NSW): announced retirement 4 August 2009 
 Senator Alan Ferguson (SA): announced retirement 4 March 2010
 Senator Nick Minchin (SA): announced retirement 24 March 2010
 Senator Judith Troeth (Vic): announced retirement 14 January 2009

National
 Kay Hull MP (Riverina, NSW): announced retirement 6 April 2010

House of Representatives
Sitting members are shown in bold text. Successful candidates are highlighted in the relevant colour. Where there is possible confusion, an asterisk (*) is also used.

Australian Capital Territory

New South Wales

Northern Territory

Queensland

South Australia

Tasmania

Victoria

Western Australia

Senate
Sitting senators are shown in bold text. Tickets that elected at least one Senator are highlighted in the relevant colour. Successful candidates are identified by an asterisk (*).

Australian Capital Territory
Two Senate places were up for election. The Labor Party was defending one seat. The Liberal Party was defending one seat.

New South Wales
Six Senate places were up for election. The Labor Party was defending three seats. The Liberal-National Coalition was defending three seats. Senators Mark Arbib (Labor), Doug Cameron (Labor), Helen Coonan (Liberal), Marise Payne (Liberal), Ursula Stephens (Labor) and John Williams (National) were not up for re-election.

Northern Territory
Two Senate places were up for election. The Labor Party was defending one seat. The Country Liberal Party was defending one seat.

Queensland
Six Senate places were up for election. The Labor Party was defending two seats. The Liberal National Party was defending four seats. Senators Ron Boswell (Liberal National), Sue Boyce (Liberal National), Mark Furner (Labor), John Hogg (Labor), Ian Macdonald (Liberal National) and Claire Moore (Labor) were not up for re-election.

South Australia
Six Senate places were up for election. The Labor Party was defending three seats. The Liberal Party was defending three seats. Senators Cory Bernardi (Liberal), Simon Birmingham (Liberal), Don Farrell (Labor), Sarah Hanson-Young (Greens), Nick Xenophon (Independent) and Penny Wong (Labor) were not up for re-election.

Tasmania
Six Senate places were up for election. The Labor Party was defending two seats. The Liberal Party was defending three seats. The Australian Greens were defending one seat. Senators Catryna Bilyk (Labor), Bob Brown (Greens), Carol Brown (Labor), David Bushby (Liberal), Richard Colbeck (Liberal) and Nick Sherry (Labor) were not up for re-election.

Victoria
Six Senate places are up for election. The Labor Party was defending two seats. The Liberal-National Coalition was defending three seats. The Family First Party was defending one seat. Senators Jacinta Collins (Labor), David Feeney (Labor), Mitch Fifield (Liberal), Helen Kroger (Liberal), Gavin Marshall (Labor) and Scott Ryan (Liberal) were not up for re-election.

Western Australia
Six Senate places were up for election. The Labor Party was defending two seats. The Liberal Party was defending three seats. The Greens were defending one seat. Senators Mark Bishop (Labor), Michaelia Cash (Liberal), Alan Eggleston (Liberal), David Johnston (Liberal), Scott Ludlam (Greens) and Louise Pratt (Labor) were not up for re-election.

Summary by party 
Beside each party is the number of seats contested by that party in the House of Representatives for each state, as well as an indication of whether the party contested the Senate election in the respective state.

Unregistered parties and groups
Some parties and groups that did not qualify for registration with the Australian Electoral Commission nevertheless endorsed candidates, who appeared on the ballot papers as independent or unaffiliated candidates.
The Australian Protectionist Party endorsed Andrew Phillips in Mayo and Group D for the Senate in New South Wales.
The Republican Democrats endorsed Group AB for the Senate in New South Wales and ungrouped candidate Peter Pyke for the Senate in Queensland.
The Stable Population Party of Australia endorsed Group T for the Senate in New South Wales.
The Reconcile Australia Party endorsed Group X for the Senate in New South Wales.
WA First endorsed Group V for the Senate in Western Australia.
 The First Nations Political Party (FNPP) endorsed Kenny Lechleitner in Lingiari and ungrouped candidate Maurie Ryan for the Senate in the Northern Territory.
The Ecology, Social Justice, Aboriginal Party, affiliated with the FNPP, endorsed Dot Henry in Hasluck, Geoffrey Stokes in O'Connor and Group U for the Senate in Western Australia.
The Revolutionary Socialist Party endorsed Hamish Chitts in Griffith and Van Rudd in Lalor.
The Communist League endorsed Ronald Poulsen in Blaxland.
Stop Population Growth Now endorsed Bill Spragg in Mayo.

See also
 2010 Australian federal election
 Members of the Australian House of Representatives, 2007–2010
 Members of the Australian Senate, 2008–2011
 List of political parties in Australia
 Divisions of the Australian House of Representatives

References

External links
Australian Electoral Commission
ABC Election Guide 2010

2010 elections in Australia
Candidates for Australian federal elections